"" is the 13th single by Zard and released 24 December 1994 under B-Gram Records label. The single debuted at #2 rank first week. It charted for 10 weeks and sold over 738,000 copies.

Track list
All songs are written by Izumi Sakai.

composer and arrangement: Tetsurō Oda
Take Me to Your Dream
composer: Daria Kawashima/arrangement: Masao Akashi
 (original karaoke)

References

1994 singles
Zard songs
Songs written by Izumi Sakai
Songs written by Tetsurō Oda
1994 songs